I-Radio is an Indonesian radio network headquartered in Jakarta. The network only plays Indonesian pop songs.

Its headquarters are at Sarinah Tower Lt 8, Jl. MH. Thamrin 11 Central Jakarta.

History 
The MRA Group, at that time had owned Hard Rock FM, was expanding their radio network. In 2000, MRA created IRADIO and TRAXFM by acquisitions. IRADIO broadcast for the first time in 3 April 2000, while MTV On Sky was on test broadcast until 1 July 2000.

At the time of creation, I-Radio competed with Terminal Musik Indonesia (TMI) 89.6 FM and station become 103.4 DFM) in the market. TMI studio was destroyed in 1998 Riot. IRADIO revived this format by playing only Indonesian pop songs.

Programming 
 Masih Pagi-Pagi
 Kirim Salam
 Masih Sore-Sore
 10 Lagu Keren I-Radio
 Sorelam (provincial stations using WITA time standard, due to Jakarta relay everyday 2pm-4pm WIB)
 Senandung Cinta (weekend)
 I-Rock (Sunday)
 I-Fakta (news)

Network 
IRADIO has 6 provincial stations, makes it the most nationwide MRA radio brand.
 101.4 IRADIO Jakarta (PM2FGE)
 105.1 IRADIO Bandung (PM3FXU)
 88.7 FM I-Radio Yogyakarta (PM5FIY)
 98.3 FM I-Radio Medan (PM3FBN)
 96.0 FM I-Radio Makassar (PM8FOB)
 90.1 FM I-Radio Banjarmasin(unknown callsign)

Slogan 
100 Persen Musik Indonesia Paling Ekseizz (2000-Sekarang)

References

Indonesian radio networks
Radio stations in Jakarta